The 102 Incheon Tower was a supertall twin tower proposed for construction in Songdo International City, Incheon, South Korea. The design consisted of two 151 floor,  supertall skyscrapers connected by three skybridges. The building would have become the tallest twin towers in the world, surpassing the Petronas Towers in Kuala Lumpur, Malaysia, and one of the tallest buildings in Asia. After the late-2000s recession, the tower was postponed with the possibility of a redesign at a lower height. The height of the tower was reduced from 613 metres to 487 metres while keeping the design the same.

The Skyscraper was designed to represent Songdo City. It would have included offices, residential space, and a hotel. It would have been a Korean landmark upon completion. Developer Portman Holdings, run by John Portman, signed an agreement with South Korean officials to build the tower. Construction started with groundbreaking on 20 June 2008. Construction halted in 2009. Construction resumed in 2013, but the project was cancelled in 2016.

Floor plans
The following is a breakdown of floors of the original 151 story design:

References

External links
  Incheon Towers on SkyscraperPage
  Incheon Tower 1
  Incheon Tower 2
  Incheon Tower complex

Buildings and structures in Incheon
Twin towers
Buildings and structures under construction in South Korea
Songdo International Business District

pt:Incheon Tower